Gate Mudaliyar Mohammed Samsudeen Kariapper was a Sri Lankan politician. He was the Parliamentary Secretary to the Minister of Justice and Member of Parliament for Kalmunai.

Early life
Kariapper was born in 1899 and educated at Wesley College, Colombo. He was also a Chief Headman.

Political career
Kariapper was elected to Parliament at the 1947 parliamentary election to represent Kalmunai, as a United National Party candidate. He was defeated at the 1952 parliamentary election.

Kariapper entered local politics and became chairman of Kalmunai Town Council. He was elected to Parliament at the 1956 parliamentary election to represent Kalmunai, this time as an Illankai Tamil Arasu Kachchi candidate. He crossed over to the government within six months of the election. He was appointed Parliamentary Secretary to the Minister of Justice. He was re-elected to Parliament at the March 1960 parliamentary election, this time as a Lanka Democratic Party candidate.

Kariapper formed the All Ceylon Islamic United Front in 1960 and contested the July 1960 parliamentary election as an ACIUF candidate. He was defeated. In late 1960 he was found guilty of corruption by the Thalagodapitiya Bribery Commission. 

Kariapper made a second parliamentary comeback when he was elected to parliament at the 1965 parliamentary election to represent Kalmunai, this time as an independent candidate. However he lost his seat and his civic rights were suspended for seven years following the enactment of the Imposition Of Civic Disabilities (Special Provisions) Act (No. 14 of 1965) based on the Thalagodapitiya Bribery Commission Report.

References
 

1899 births
1989 deaths
Alumni of Wesley College, Colombo
Members of the 1st Parliament of Ceylon
Members of the 3rd Parliament of Ceylon
Members of the 4th Parliament of Ceylon
Members of the 6th Parliament of Ceylon
Parliamentary secretaries of Ceylon
Sri Lankan Muslims
United National Party politicians
Illankai Tamil Arasu Kachchi politicians
Sri Lankan politicians convicted of crimes